Final standings of the 1973–74 Hungarian League season.

Final standings

Results

Statistical leaders

Top goalscorers

References

External links
 IFFHS link

Nemzeti Bajnokság I seasons
1973–74 in Hungarian football
Hun